Taylors Lakes Secondary College (TLSC) is a school situated in Melbourne's north western suburbs on Parmelia Drive, Taylors Lakes, Victoria, Australia.

Notable Former Students
 Cameron Rayner – Australian Rules Footballer

References

External links
Taylors Lakes Secondary College

Secondary schools in Melbourne
Educational institutions established in 1992
1992 establishments in Australia